A referendum on partially legalising abortion was held in Gibraltar 24 June 2021. It had originally been scheduled for 19 March 2020, but was postponed on 12 March 2020 due to the COVID-19 pandemic. The proposal was approved by 63% of voters.

Background
On 12 July 2019, the Gibraltar Parliament passed the Crimes (Amendment) Act 2019 (which allows abortions in certain circumstances) by a vote of 10–7. Nine of the ten MPs from the GSLP–Liberal Alliance, as well as the one Together Gibraltar MP, voted in favour. GSLP MP Albert Isola voted against the bill together with the six Gibraltar Social Democrat MPs. Seeking to establish popular support for the proposal, MPs unanimously approved a referendum on the legislation, with the government deciding the date. Following the victory of the ruling coalition in the October 2019 general elections, the government decided on 19 December to schedule the referendum for 19 March 2020. The government also decided to lower the voting age for the referendum to 16. The ballot question was set as "Should the Crimes Amendment Act 2019, that defines the circumstances which would allow abortion in Gibraltar, come into force?"

Campaign
Government funding of up to £50,000 was provided for the 'yes' and 'no' campaigns, with each campaign limited to spending £50,000 in total.

A 'Gibraltar for Yes' group was formed to campaign in favour of the change, consisting of Choice Gibraltar, Feminist Gibraltar, No More Shame Gibraltar and the Secular Humanist Society of Gibraltar. The group was backed by Chief Minister Fabian Picardo.

The Gibraltar Pro-Life Movement ("GPLM") opposed the change. In June 2021 it accused Picardo of making misleading statements about the new law.

Results
On 25 June it was announced by GBC News that the referendum proposal had been approved by voters. Chief Minister Fabian Picardo stated that the government would bring the Crimes Amendment Act 2019 into effect within 28 days.

See also
Abortion in Gibraltar

References

Abortion referendum
Gibraltar
Gibraltar
Gibraltar 
Referendums in Gibraltar
Gibraltar